Acroneuria is a genus of common stoneflies in the family Perlidae. There are more than 30 described species in Acroneuria.

Species
These 32 species belong to the genus Acroneuria:

 Acroneuria abnormis (Newman, 1838) (common stone)
 Acroneuria apicalis Stark & Sivec, 2008
 Acroneuria arenosa (Pictet, 1841) (eastern stone)
 Acroneuria arida (Hagen, 1861)
 Acroneuria azunensis Stark & Sivec, 2008
 Acroneuria bachma Cao & Bae, 2007
 Acroneuria carolinensis (Banks, 1905) (Carolina stone)
 Acroneuria covelli Grubbs & Stark, 2004
 Acroneuria distinguenda Zwick, 1977
 Acroneuria evoluta Klapálek, 1909 (constricted stone)
 Acroneuria filicis Frison, 1942
 Acroneuria flinti Stark & Gaufin, 1976
 Acroneuria frisoni Stark & Brown, 1991
 Acroneuria grahamia Wu & Claassen, 1934
 Acroneuria hainana Wu, 1938
 Acroneuria hitchcocki Kondratieff & Kirchner, 1988
 Acroneuria internata (Walker, 1852)
 Acroneuria kirchneri Stark & Kondratieff, 2004
 Acroneuria kosztarabi Kondratieff & Kirchner, 1993
 Acroneuria lycorias (Newman, 1839) (boreal stone)
 Acroneuria magnifica Cao & Bae, 2007
 Acroneuria morsei Du, 2000
 Acroneuria multiconata Du, 2000
 Acroneuria nobilitata Enderlein, 1909
 Acroneuria omeiana Wu, 1948
 Acroneuria ozarkensis Poulton & Stewart, 1991
 Acroneuria perplexa Frison, 1937
 Acroneuria personata Harper, 1976
 Acroneuria petersi Stark & Gaufin, 1976
 Acroneuria sinica Yang & Yang, 1998
 Acroneuria yuchi Stark & Kondratieff, 2004
 Acroneuria zhejiangensis Yang & Yang, 1995

References

Further reading

External links

 

Perlidae
Articles created by Qbugbot